The women's 49 kg competition at the 2019 World Weightlifting Championships was held on 18 and 19 September 2019.

Schedule

Medalists

Records

 Chayuttra Pramongkhol's world record was rescinded in February 2020.

Results

New records

* Not a world record at the time of the competition

References

Results 

Women's 49 kg
2019 in women's weightlifting